James Gates Percival (September 15, 1795 – May 2, 1856) was an American poet, surgeon, and geologist, born in Berlin, Connecticut, and died in Hazel Green, Wisconsin.

Biography
He was a precocious child, and a morbid and impractical, though versatile, man, with a facility in writing verse on all manner of subjects and in nearly every known meter. His sentimentalism appealed to a wide circle. He had also a reputation as a geologist. Percival entered Yale College at the age of 16, and graduated at the age of 20 at the head of his class. After graduating he was admitted to the practice of medicine and relocated to Charleston, South Carolina, where he pursued that profession. A volume of his collected poems was published in New York and London in 1823. In 1824 he was briefly a professor of chemistry at West Point, where he resigned after a few months, and subsequently several years of his labor were devoted to assisting Noah Webster in editing his great American Dictionary of the English Language of 1828. In 1835 Percival was commissioned by the governor of Connecticut to prepare a geological survey of the state, which was completed and published in 1842. In 1854 he was appointed to make a similar geological survey for the state of Wisconsin, with the title State Geologist. The first annual report was issued in 1855, and while preparing the second annual report for the press he succumbed to illness and died in May 1856. Most of his life was spent at his home in New Haven, Connecticut. After his death he was the subject of an admiring biography by Julius H. Ward.

Select works
Poems (1821)
Clio. No. 1-2 (1822)
Prometheus, Part II, with Other Poems (1823)
Poems (1823)
A Geographical View of the World Embracing the Manners, Customs, and Pursuits of Every Nation, ed. (1825)
Poem delivered before the Connecticut Alpha of the Phi Beta Kappa Society (1826)
Clio. No. 3 (1827)
Report on the Geology of the State of Connecticut (1842)
The Dream of a Day (1843).
Annual Report of the Geological Survey of the State of Wisconsin (1855-1856)
A short poem by him, "The Language of Flowers", was set to music by the English composer Edward Elgar at the age of fourteen.

References

Sources

Life and Letters of James Gates Percival, by J.H. Ward (Boston: Ticknor & Fields, 1866).

John Hay, "The Limits of Recovery: The Failure of James Gates Percival," Early American Literature, vol. 55, no. 1 (2020)

External links

 James Gates Percival Collection. Yale Collection of American Literature, Beinecke Rare Book and Manuscript Library.

1795 births
1856 deaths
People from Berlin, Connecticut
People from Hazel Green, Wisconsin
United States Military Academy faculty
19th-century American poets
American male poets
Poets from Connecticut
Poets from Wisconsin
American geologists
19th-century American male writers